Nice Dream may refer to:

 "(Nice Dream)", a song by the band Radiohead
 Nice Dreams, a film starring Cheech and Chong